The 1925 Wightman Cup was the third edition of the Wightman Cup, the annual women's team tennis competition between the United States and Great Britain. It was held at the West Side Tennis Club in Forest Hills, New York, United States. Great Britain defeated the United States to win their second title, the first time the cup was won by the visiting team.

Result

See also
 1925 Davis Cup

References

Wightman Cups by year
Wightman Cup
Wightman Cup
Wightman Cup
Wightman Cup